The 2004–05 FIBA Europe Cup was the third season of the  FIBA Europe Cup, Europe's fourth level professional club basketball tournament. The season started on 2 November 2004, and ended on 11 April 2005. A total number of 32 teams participated in the competition.

Conference West

Qualifying round

Group A

Conference North

Qualifying round

Group A

Group B

Group C

Play-offs

Central Conference

Group A

Group B

Play-offs

Conference South

Qualifying round

Group A

Group B

Group C

Play-offs

Pan-European playoffs
In the pan-European play-offs, teams played in two-legged series in the quarterfinals. The Final Four was held in Ploiești from 9 until 10 April 2005.

External links
2004–05 FIBA Europe Cup Men Official website

FIBA EuroCup Challenge
2004–05 in European basketball